Deluz is a commune in the Doubs department in the Bourgogne-Franche-Comté region in eastern France.

The construction of the Rhône–Rhine Canal in 1821 created a narrow spit of land which, along with the water power from the weir, allowed the development of cloth spinning (1858–1872) and paper making (1873–1977). The abandoned buildings now house a small hydroelectric plant.

Population

See also
 Communes of the Doubs department

References

External links
Official website
Personal website about Deluz

Communes of Doubs